The BR18  is a bullpup assault rifle made by ST Kinetics of Singapore.

The rifle was officially unveiled at the Singapore Airshow 2014 as the Bullpup Multirole Combat Rifle. The rifle is designed to fire both 5.56×45mm NATO and ST Kinetics Extended Range 5.56mm ammunition and comes as standard with MIL-STD-1913 Picatinny rails at the three, six, nine and 12 o’clock positions.

Its production will enable the Singaporean military to phase out the SAR 21 from service. It is also offered for sale on the international market.

History
The BR18 first made an appearance at the 2012 Singapore Airshow, where it was known as the Next-Gen Concept Bullpup Rifle. In 2014, the BR18 was first unveiled in the Eurosatory exhibition, called the BMCR. The rifle was to be available to both military and law enforcement markets by early 2015.

After user trials were conducted in 2017, ST Kinetics demonstrated the production version of the rifle, which was given the name of BR18 at the 2018 Singapore Airshow exhibition.

Design
The BR18's barrel is coated with a proprietary dry lubricant which repels sand, dust, and gunpowder soot for easier maintenance. The rifle is also designed to be over the beach (OTB) capable, enabling the operator to safely fire after submerging the rifle in water.

The weapon is constructed of reinforced, blast-proof polymer and is equipped with MIL-STD-1913 "Picatinny" rails to mount scopes and other tactical accessories. While the design was influenced by the SAR-21, the BR18 allows it to be used by both left or right handed users with empty casing ejections set forward and to the right, away from the person's face if the weapon is fired from the left shoulder. This negates the necessity of a deflector to ensure the person's face is not hit by ejected hot brass.

ST Kinetics has said that the BR18 has an effective range of 460 m and 800 m when fired with M193 and SS109 ammunition respectively, with a muzzle velocity of 860 m/s when employing SS109 rounds out of the "Assault" variant, equipped with a 14.5" barrel.

The charging handle is placed above the trigger guard. Initial designs showed the charging handle positioned above the cheek rest, which meant that the person would have been forced to move away from the rifle in order to pull the bolt. Pre-production models improved on this by designing the charging handle to be foldable with one hand and pulled back by using two fingers, using the force of the handle moving to be stowed.

The trigger guard can be flipped outwards so that the shooter can handle the weapon if using gloves.

While a 5.56 version is already scheduled for production, a 7.62x51mm NATO version is currently being developed. The BR18 can use a STK-made 40 GL attached underneath the barrel via picatinny rails.

Gallery

Variants
The BR18 is available in the following configurations:
 Assault rifle: Has an overall length of 645mm with a  barrel.
 Light machine gun: Has a  barrel.
 Marksman rifle.

See also 
 Conventional Multirole Combat Rifle

References

External links
 Official Site

5.56 mm assault rifles
Assault rifles of Singapore
Bullpup rifles
Weapons and ammunition introduced in 2018